The John Holland Group is an infrastructure, building, rail and transport business operating in Australia and New Zealand. Headquartered in Melbourne, it is a subsidiary of China Communications Construction.

History
The company was founded in 1949 by John Holland. In 1991 the business was purchased by Janet Holmes à Court's Heytesbury Pty Ltd. In 2000, Leighton Holdings bought a 70% stake in the company, this was increased to 99% in 2004 and 100% in December 2007. In December 2002, the construction assets of Transfield Holdings were acquired.

In November 2012, John Holland Tunnelling was awarded the International Tunnelling Contractor of the Year, for the Northern Sewerage Project in Melbourne.

In December 2014, Leighton Holdings agreed terms with China Communications Construction to sell John Holland. The transaction was completed in April 2015 after the Federal Government approved the sale.

Major projects
Major projects include:

Transport
As part of the consortium selected to build the Alice Springs to Darwin railway line, John Holland took a 7.5% shareholding in the Asia Pacific Transport Consortium in 2000. John Holland has interests in Metro Trains Melbourne and Metro Trains Sydney that operate the Melbourne suburban train network and Sydney Metro respectively.

In January 2012, John Holland commenced the operation and maintenance of the New South Wales Regional Network under a ten-year contract with Transport for NSW, comprising 2,400 route kilometres of operational passenger and freight rail lines and 3,100 route kilometres of non-operational lines. This ceased at the end of 2021 with the contract passing to UGL Rail.

In April 2019, John Holland commenced the operation and maintenance of the Canberra Light Rail through its Canberra Metro Operations (CMET) joint venture.

In July 2020, John Holland became responsible for maintenance of the Glenelg tram line in Adelaide as part of the Torrens Connect consortium. In April 2022, Transdev John Holland commenced operating Sydney Bus Region 9 in the Eastern Suburbs under contract to Transport for NSW.

References

External links
Company website

Companies based in Melbourne
Construction and civil engineering companies of Australia
Construction and civil engineering companies established in 1949
Railway infrastructure companies of Australia
Australian companies established in 1949
2015 mergers and acquisitions
Australian subsidiaries of foreign companies